Mihail Uram (born June 20, 1924) is a Hungarian former football player.

Career
Born in Budapest, Uram began playing youth football in Mukachevo. Next, he played senior football for local sides Dynamo Mukachevo and Bolshevik Mukachevo. He signed with ŠK Bratislava in Czechoslovakia before moving to Italy.

Uram signed with Serie A side Lucchese before the 1948–49 season, but only made seven league appearances for the club. He would join Serie B side Spezia for the next two seasons, leaving for FBK Hungaria in the 1950–51 season winter break.

Uram finished his playing career in the Americas, first joining Colombian side Atlético Junior and then New York Hungaria in the United States.

References

External links
Profile at Juniorbarranquilla.com

1924 births
Living people
Footballers from Budapest
Hungarian footballers
Hungarian expatriate footballers
Serie A players
Serie B players
Categoría Primera A players
ŠK Slovan Bratislava players
S.S.D. Lucchese 1905 players
Spezia Calcio players
Atlético Junior footballers
Expatriate footballers in the Soviet Union
Expatriate footballers in Czechoslovakia
Expatriate footballers in Italy
Expatriate footballers in Colombia
Expatriate soccer players in the United States
Association football midfielders